The Major Mining Sites of Wallonia is a UNESCO World Heritage Site comprising four sites in Wallonia in southern Belgium associated with the Belgian coal mining industry of the 19th and 20th centuries. The four sites of the grouping, situated in the French-speaking Hainaut Province and Liège Province, comprise Grand-Hornu, the Bois-du-Luc, the Bois du Cazier and Blegny-Mine.

Description
The site was recognized by the UNESCO commission in 2012 and is officially described:

History
During the Industrial Revolution in the 19th century, mining and the heavy industry that relied on coal formed a major part of Belgium's economy. Most of this mining and industry took place in the sillon industriel ("industrial valley" in French), a strip of land running across the country where many of the largest cities in Wallonia are located. The named locations of this World Heritage Site are all situated in or near the area of the sillon industriel.

The mining sector in Belgium declined during the 20th century during deindustrialization and today the four mines listed are no longer operational. Today, they are each open to visitors as museums and are an important part of Belgian industrial heritage.

Sites

See also

Belgium in "the long nineteenth century"
Industrial archaeology
The International Committee for the Conservation of the Industrial Heritage

References

Further reading

World Heritage Sites in Belgium
Industrial history of Belgium
Walloon culture